Tanggu (Tangu, Tanggum) is a Ramu language of Papua New Guinea.

References

Ataitan languages
Languages of Madang Province